A list of the earliest American films released in the 1890s.

1890s

See also
 1890 in the United States
 1891 in the United States
 1892 in the United States
 1893 in the United States
 1894 in the United States
 1895 in the United States
 1896 in the United States
 1897 in the United States
 1898 in the United States
 1899 in the United States

External links
1896 films at the Internet Movie Database
1897 films at the Internet Movie Database
1898 films at the Internet Movie Database
1899 films at the Internet Movie Database

 
1890
American